Ultimate Hits is a greatest hits album by The Steve Miller Band released in September 2017 by Capitol Records. Compiled by Miller himself, it features tracks that he felt were best representative of his career spanning more than fifty years. The deluxe edition includes the entirety of Greatest Hits 1974-78 with the exception of "Winter Time" which is on the standard edition, and both editions feature some of the band's most popular singles like "The Joker," "Take the Money and Run," "Fly Like an Eagle," "Jet Airliner," "Swingtown," "Jungle Love," and "Abracadabra." Previously unreleased studio tracks and live performances from his 21st Century line-up also appear.

Standard version track listing
All tracks written by Steve Miller, unless otherwise noted.

Deluxe edition track listing
All tracks written by Steve Miller, unless otherwise noted.

Disc one

Disc two

References

2017 greatest hits albums
Steve Miller Band compilation albums
Capitol Records compilation albums
Universal Music Group compilation albums